The 2019 Northeast Conference baseball tournament began on May 23 and end on May 26 at Senator Thomas J. Dodd Memorial Stadium in Norwich, Connecticut.  The league's top four finishers competed in the double elimination tournament. The tournament winner, Central Connecticut, earned the Northeast Conference's automatic bid to the 2019 NCAA Division I baseball tournament.  Central Connecticut has won the most tournament championships among current members, while Fairleigh Dickinson has never won a championship.  LIU Brooklyn won their first title in 2018.

Seeding and format
The top four finishers were seeded one through four based on conference regular season winning percentage.  They then played a double-elimination tournament.

Bracket

Conference championship

References

Tournament
Northeast Conference Baseball Tournament
Northeast Conference baseball tournament
Northeast Conference baseball tournament